The Historical Museum of Serbia is a public institution dedicated to documentation of history of Serbia from prehistory up to the present. The museum was established in 1963 and today it preserves over 35,000 exhibits in its collection. Over the years the museum was located at different locations around the capital city of Belgrade. In 2020, as a part of the Belgrade Waterfront development project, the museum was granted the historical building of the Belgrade Main railway station as its new permanent base. The museum is one of the leading institutions of its kind in the city and the country.

History
The first unsuccessful initiative to establish the museum was taken in 1950 with the enactment of the Decree on the establishment of the History Museum of the People's Republic of Serbia. The proposal was reinitiated in 1954 with the establishment of the Serbian Revolution Museum (hosted by the Residence of Prince Miloš) commemorating the 150th anniversary of the First Serbian Uprising.

The Historical Museum of Serbia was established by the decision of the People's Republic of Serbia authorities on 20 February 1963 with the new institution absorbing the Serbian Revolution Museum. The task of the Museum was defined in 1966 as follows: ″to collect, record, store, arrange, study and exhibit material from the history of the Serbian people and Serbia from the earliest times to the present day″.

Until 2003 the museum published the  scientific journal Zbornik Istorijskog muzeja Srbije. Initially, from 1954 to 1965, it was published by the Serbian Revolution Museum.

In November 2020 the Serbian government made the decision to relocate the museum to a far bigger building, which formerly served as Belgrade Main railway station.

See also
 List of museums in Serbia

References

External links

 

History museums in Serbia
Museums in Belgrade
Museums established in 1963